Milan Fretin (born 19 March 2001) is a Belgian racing cyclist, who currently rides for UCI ProTeam .

Major results

Road
2018
 9th Paris–Roubaix Juniors
 9th E3 Harelbeke Junioren
2019
 2nd Johan Museeuw Classic
 3rd Nokere Koerse Juniores
 9th Trofee van Vlaanderen
2021
 2nd Omloop Het Nieuwsblad Beloften
 2nd Mémorial Bjorg Lambrecht
 6th Overall Okolo Jižních Čech
2022
 3rd Sluitingsprijs Putte-Kapellen 
 10th Münsterland Giro
2023
 10th Dorpenomloop Rucphen

Track
2018
 1st  Elimination race, UEC European Junior Track Championships
 National Junior Track Championships
1st  Keirin
1st  Madison (with Arno Waeyaert)

References

External links

2001 births
Living people
Belgian male cyclists
Sportspeople from Genk
Cyclists from Limburg (Belgium)